The National Anti-Drug Office or ONA (in Spanish: Oficina Nacional Antidrogas) is a Venezuelan law enforcement agency of executive authority responsible for drafting state policy, legal regulation, control and monitoring in combating trafficking drugs, psychotropic substances, and their precursors. The ONA is specially authorized to address and solve problems relating to traffic in narcotic drugs, psychotropic substances, and their precursors.

Froom an organizational point of view, the O.N.A. is a decentralized body with functional autonomy, administrative and financial, established by Decree No. 4220, from January 23, 2006. the National Drugs Fund (FONA) is external service under the Office of National Drug Control (ONA), established by Decree No. 6778, from June 26, 2009.

Mission
To take control of a strategic sector for the security of the nation, as is the fight against the production, trafficking and consumption of illicit drugs and the crime of laundering of the proceeds of marketing, on April 25, 2013, was published a Presidential Decree No. 25, which determines the incorporation of the National Anti-Drug Office (ONA) to the organizational structure of the Vice Presidency of Venezuela.

See also

Crime in Venezuela
Law enforcement in Venezuela
Illegal drug trade in Venezuela
DEA, The U.S. Counterpart
FSKN, The Russian Counterpart

References

External links
ONA Official Website

Drug control law enforcement agencies
Specialist law enforcement agencies of Venezuela
Illegal drug trade in Venezuela